The Huawei Nova 3i is an Android smartphone manufactured by Huawei as part of its mid-range Nova series. The phone was released on 21 July 2018.

Specifications

Display and camera 
Huawei Nova 3i has a 6.3-inch IPS LCD screen with a 1080p resolution and a 19.5:9 aspect ratio. It has a total of four cameras: a 16MP + 2MP with PDAF and dual flash on the back, and a 24MP + 2MP on the front.

Storage and configuration 
The phone comes with 128GB of internal storage (eMMC 5.1), which can be expanded up to 400GB. It is powered by Huawei's HiSilicon Kirin 710 chipset paired with 4GB of RAM. It has a rear-mounted fingerprint scanner for improved security.

Battery and connectivity 
The phone comes with a 3340 mAh Li-ion battery, a microUSB charging port, and a 3.5 mm audio jack for wired headphones. It supports 4G connectivity.

Software 
The phone was shipped with Android Oreo overlaid with Huawei's EMUI 8.0. Huawei released a software update upgrading the phone to EMUI 9.1 based on Android Pie.

Colour variants 
This model comes in three colours: Pearl White, Black and Iris Purple.

References 

Huawei smartphones
Discontinued smartphones